Lucius William Archer (June 9, 1899 – December 9, 1988) was an American baseball pitcher in the Negro leagues. He played with the Lincoln Giants in 1919 and 1920 and the Baltimore Black Sox in 1922.

References

External links
  and Seamheads

Baltimore Black Sox players
Lincoln Giants players
1899 births
1988 deaths
Baseball players from South Carolina
Baseball pitchers
20th-century African-American sportspeople